Made in Hong Kong is Claudja Barry's fifth studio album, released in 1981. By this album, she had shed her "disco diva" image thus avoiding much of the American disco blacklash at the time. It includes the hit single, "Radio Action".

Track listings
 "Radio Action"
 "Made in Hong Kong"
 "Don't Take to the Wind"
 "Take Me to the River" (Al Green, Mabon "Teenie" Hodges)
 "Take Me Back"
 "Love Control"
 "What'cha Doin' to Me"
 "Sweet Inspiration"
 "Crazy Girl"

References

External links
 Claudja Barry-Made In Hong Kong at Discogs

1981 albums
Claudja Barry albums
Polydor Records albums